Gorgasia cotroneii is an eel in the family Congridae (conger/garden eels). It was described by Umberto D'Ancona in 1928, originally under the genus Leptocephalus. It is a marine, tropical eel which is known from the Red Sea, in the western Indian Ocean.

Etymology
The fish is named in honor of Italian zoologist Giulio Cotronei (1885–1962), who was Director of the Institute of Comparative Anatomy, R. Università di Roma, where describer D’Ancona was based.

References

Endemic fauna of Sudan
cotroneii
Taxa named by Umberto D'Ancona
Fish described in 1928